Homo sapiens (Latin: "wise man") is the taxonomic binomial species name for humans.

Homo sapiens or Homo Sapiens may also refer to:

Music
 Homo Sapiens (band), an Italian pop-rock band

Albums
 Homo sapiens, Jorge Ben
 Homo Sapiens (album), 1994 album by Finnish rock group YUP
 Homosapien (album), 1981 album by Pete Shelley

Songs
 "Homo Sapiens" (song), 2006 song from The Cooper Temple Clause's third album Make This Your Own released in 2007
 "Homosapien" (song), the 1981 title track by Pete Shelley
 Homo Sapien, song from Lenka's 2017 album, Attune.

Other
 Homo Sapiens 1900, 1998 documentary directed by Peter Cohen
 Homo Sapiens (film), 2016 documentary directed by Nikolaus Geyrhalter
 Homo sapiens (novel), 1896 novel about deviance and sexuality, by Stanisław Przybyszewski

See also
 Early modern human
 List of alternative names for the human species
 See Human subspecies for proposed subspecies of Homo sapiens:
 Homo sapiens idaltu, a proposed subspecies (extinct) related to the modern human subspecies Homo sapiens sapiens
 Homo sapiens neanderthalensis, an alternative to Homo neanderthalsis that implies Neanderthal man might be a subspecies more closely related to modern humans
 Homo sapiens rhodesiensis, an alternative nomenclature for Homo rhodesiensis
 Homo sapiens sapiens, subspecies that precisely represents modern humans, the earliest of whom emerged about 200,000 years ago – the only human subspecies still alive on Earth